Cumbernauld South is one of the twenty-one wards used to elect members of the North Lanarkshire Council. Created in 2007, it elects four Councillors and covers the south-western parts of Cumbernauld (Carbrain, Condorrat, Greenfaulds and Ravenswood). A 2017 review caused the loss of the town centre commercial area and the Seafar neighbourhood (excepting the McGregor Road area) with the population decreasing as a result – in 2019, this was 15,905.

Councillors

Election Results

2017 Election

2012 Election

2007 Election

References

Wards of North Lanarkshire
Cumbernauld